Charles Cornelius Smith (born August 22, 1975) is an American former professional basketball player. He was the Alphonso Ford Trophy winner and an All-EuroLeague Second Team selection in 2005.

High school
Smith played high school basketball at Dunbar High School, in Fort Worth.

College career
Collegiately, Smith was a star at the University of New Mexico, with the Lobos.

Professional career
Smith played with the Denver Nuggets, the Portland Trail Blazers, the Miami Heat, the Los Angeles Clippers, and the San Antonio Spurs in the NBA. A prolific scorer, he starred in European national leagues with Makedonikos Kozani, Virtus Bologna, and Efes Istanbul. With the Italian League team Scavolini Pesaro in 2005, he won the first-ever Alphonso Ford Trophy, as he was the best scorer in the 2004–05 EuroLeague season.

He was also named the Finals MVP of the ULEB Cup (now called EuroCup) in the 2006–07 season, while playing with the Spanish ACB League club Real Madrid. He moved back to the Turkish Basketball Super League for the 2008–09 season, when he signed with Efes Pilsen. He moved back to Italy for the 2010–11 season, when he signed a one-year contract with Lottomatica Roma.

References

External links

Charles Smith at acb.com 
Charles Smith at euroleague.net
Charles Smith at nba.com
Charles Smith at legabasket.it 
Charles Smith at tblstat.net

1975 births
Living people
20th-century African-American sportspeople
21st-century African-American sportspeople
African-American basketball players
American expatriate basketball people in Greece
American expatriate basketball people in Italy
American expatriate basketball people in Spain
American expatriate basketball people in Turkey
American men's basketball players
Anadolu Efes S.K. players
Basketball players from Texas
Denver Nuggets players
Liga ACB players
Los Angeles Clippers players
Makedonikos B.C. players
Miami Heat draft picks
Miami Heat players
New Mexico Lobos men's basketball players
Pallacanestro Virtus Roma players
Pallalcesto Amatori Udine players
Portland Trail Blazers players
Real Madrid Baloncesto players
Rockford Lightning players
San Antonio Spurs players
Shooting guards
Sportspeople from Fort Worth, Texas
Victoria Libertas Pallacanestro players
Virtus Bologna players